Colley  may refer to:

 Colley (given name), a masculine given name
 Colley (surname), a surname
 Colley, Virginia, United States
 Colley Township, Sullivan County, Pennsylvania, United States

See also
 Colley Matrix, a computer-generated sports rating system
 Colley Report, an Irish Government paper on same-sex partnership
 McColley
 Kolley (disambiguation)